Low is an American post-apocalyptic science fiction comics series written by Rick Remender and drawn by Greg Tocchini. Low was published from July 2014 to December 2020 by Image Comics, for a total of 26 issues.

The series is set billions of years in the future of the Earth after the start of the sun's expansion into a red giant has made the surface uninhabitable. It follows the lives of the two million survivors in the underwater city of Salus; its helmsmen, the Caine family; and its pirate enemies. The protagonists of the first issues are Stel Caine, who searches for life-supporting planets with robotic probes, her husband Johl, and their children. Remender summarized the story as being about "one woman's optimism in the face of inevitable and true doom".

The first issues of the series received critical praise. In Paste magazine, Robert Tutton wrote of the "primal, silent awe" inspired by Tocchini's "surreal" and "dazzling" art. In IGN, Tres Dean noted the creators' "complex and intriguing worldbuilding and precise, emotional character work", as well as Tocchini's "impeccable and breathtaking" art.

Collected editions

References

External links
Low: Image Comics
Humanity's Final Hour in Low
Low published in Italy by Edizioni Star Comics

Image Comics titles
2014 comics debuts
Comics by Rick Remender